Miguel Alejandro Madero Irigoyen (born 3 April 1896, date of death unknown) was an Argentine rowing coxswain. He competed in the men's eight event at the 1924 Summer Olympics.

References

External links
 

1896 births
Year of death missing
Argentine male rowers
Olympic rowers of Argentina
Rowers at the 1924 Summer Olympics
Rowers from Buenos Aires
Coxswains (rowing)